Robert McClelland Barr (December, 1856 – March 11, 1930) was a Major League Baseball pitcher.  He also made some appearances as an outfielder, first baseman, and third baseman.

Barr played for the Pittsburgh Alleghenys, Washington Nationals, Indianapolis Hoosiers, and Rochester Broncos, all of the American Association.  He also played for the National League teams the Washington Nationals and New York Giants.

See also
 List of Major League Baseball annual saves leaders

External links

19th-century baseball players
Baseball players from Washington, D.C.
Major League Baseball pitchers
Pittsburgh Alleghenys players
Washington Nationals (AA) players
Indianapolis Hoosiers (AA) players
Washington Nationals (1886–1889) players
Rochester Broncos players
New York Giants (NL) players
1856 births
1930 deaths
Washington Nationals (minor league) players
Rochester Maroons players
Rochester Jingoes players
Buffalo Bisons (minor league) players
Woonsocket (minor league baseball) players
Syracuse Stars (minor league baseball) players
Utica Stars players
Providence Grays (minor league) players
Providence Clamdiggers (baseball) players